The Canada 1931 census was a detailed enumeration of the Canadian population. The census count was taken as at 1 June 1931. The total population count was 10,376,379 representing a 17.9% increase over the 1911 census population count of 8,800,249. The 1931 census was the seventh comprehensive decennial census since Canadian Confederation on 1 July 1867. 
The previous census was the Northwest Provinces of Alberta, Saskatchewan, and Manitoba 1926 census and the following census was the Northwest Provinces of Alberta, Saskatchewan, and Manitoba 1936 census.

This census should become available to the public in 2023, 92 years after the census was collected.

Population by province 

The highest growth rate was in British Columbia, while Quebec added the largest number of new residents. Only Prince Edward Island and Nova Scotia experienced a decline in population.

References

1931 in Canada
1931
Canada